Mark Nielsen may refer to:

Mark Nielsen (attorney) (born 1961), former Connecticut state senator
Mark Nielsen (tennis) (born 1977), former New Zealand tennis player
Mark Nielsen (businessman) (born 1968), Australian businessman